John Eric Braun (born January 16, 1967) is an American politician from Washington. A Republican, Braun serves in the Washington State Senate, representing the 20th district. Braun serves as the President of Braun Northwest and as an officer in the US Navy Reserve.

Early life and education 
Braun was born on January 16, 1967, in Columbus, Ohio. He grew up in Ohio and attended the University of Washington on a U.S. Naval scholarship. He graduated in 1989 with a Bachelor's degree in electrical engineering. He then spent seven years on active duty with the United States Navy, and he continues to serve as a Captain in the Navy Reserve. Braun received his Master of Business Administration degree and Master of Engineering Management from the University of Michigan in 1999.

Career 
Braun ran in a three-way all-Republican primary in 2012 versus the incumbent state senator Dan Swecker and employment specialist and former substitute teacher Rae Lowery. Braun had a strong showing in the primary with 40.33 percent of the vote compared to Swecker's 46.97 percent. In the General Election, Braun greatly improved on his primary showing; defeating Swecker with 55.43 percent of the vote.

In the Senate, Braun serves as Chair of the Ways and Means Committees.

He held his first floor speech February 15, 2013, and sponsored more than 70 bills as a freshman legislator.

In November 2020, Braun was elected Washington Senate Minority Leader by members of the Republican caucus. Braun has served as the minority leader since the start of the 2021–2022 legislative session.

Awards 
 2014 Guardians of Small Business award. Presented by NFIB.

Personal life 
, he lives in Centralia with his wife and four children, while managing the family business.

References

1967 births
Living people
21st-century American politicians
American chief operating officers
Ross School of Business alumni
Republican Party Washington (state) state senators